Double, Double is a science fiction novel by John Brunner, first published in the United States as an original paperback by Ballantine Books in 1969 and reprinted in 1979 as a Del Rey paperback. A hardcover edition was released in the British market in 1971 by Sidgwick & Jackson.

Summary
Bruno and his band The Hermetic Tradition visit the North Kent coast where they plan to hold an open-air cliff-top concert. Events take an unusual turn when the band meet a fish capable of eating and doubling the things it finds.

Reception
Spider Robinson dismissed the novel, saying "there just ain't all that much right with it. . . . It's a shame writers have to do this stuff to stay alive."

References

1969 British novels
1969 science fiction novels
Novels by John Brunner
Ballantine Books books
Novels set in Kent